The 1979 Badminton World Cup was the 1st edition of an international tournament Badminton World Cup. The event was held in Tokyo, Japan from 20 January to 22 January 1979. Competitions for mixed doubles were not conducted. Indonesia won men's singles and men's doubles events while Japan won women's doubles and Denmark won women's singles event.

Medalists

Men's singles

Finals

Women's singles

Finals

Men's doubles

Finals

Women's doubles

Finals

References 
 Indonesia bolot dua gelaran dalam badminton Piala Dunia
 Pelajar Indonesia kalahkan juara Seluruh England
 Lene routs Japan's Horie in Champions' Cup shuttle tournament
 Liem to good in Cup meet

Badminton World Cup
1979 in badminton
1979 in Japanese sport
Sports competitions in Tokyo
International sports competitions hosted by Japan